The 1920 North Dakota gubernatorial election was held on November 2, 1920. Incumbent Republican Lynn Frazier defeated Democratic nominee James Francis Thaddeus O'Connor with 51.01% of the vote.

Primary elections
Primary elections were held on June 30, 1920.

Republican primary

Candidates
Lynn Frazier, incumbent Governor
William Langer, North Dakota Attorney General

Results

General election

Candidates
Lynn Frazier, Republican
James Francis Thaddeus O'Connor, Democratic

Results

References

1920
North Dakota
Gubernatorial